Switzerland competed at the 1956 Winter Olympics in Cortina d'Ampezzo, Italy.

Medalists

Alpine skiing

Men

Women

Bobsleigh

Cross-country skiing

Men

Men's 4 × 10 km relay

Figure skating

Men

Women

Ice hockey

Group C
Top two teams advanced to Medal Round.

Sweden 6-5 Switzerland
USSR 10-3 Switzerland

Games for 7th-10th places

Switzerland 7-4 Austria
Poland 6-2 Switzerland
Italy 8-3 Switzerland

Ski jumping

Speed skating

Men

References
Official Olympic Reports
International Olympic Committee results database
 Olympic Winter Games 1956, full results by sports-reference.com

Nations at the 1956 Winter Olympics
1956
1956 in Swiss sport